Saep is a Madang language spoken in Madang Province, Papua New Guinea.

Orthography

References

External links
Rosetta Project: Saep Swadesh list
Field research on the Saep language at SIL International

Yaganon languages
Languages of Madang Province